Andrew Joseph Kelly (1 January 1854 – 3 September 1913) was a Labor Party politician who served as Member for Lachlan in the New South Wales Legislative Assembly from 1891 to 1913.

Background

Andrew Kelly was born in Dublin in 1854 and went to sea at a young age. He worked for a period as a wharf labourer in Liverpool, England and also served in the United States Navy for 3 years. He settled in Sydney in 1881, where he worked again as a wharf labourer. He was active in the Wharf Labourers Union, and participated in the 1882 strike. He later worked as a drayman and helped to establish the Trolley and Draymen's Union. He served as president of the union during a strike in 1890. He was elected President of the Sydney Trades and Labour Council in 1889. He was also active in local government, serving as alderman on Sydney City Council from 1900 to 1906 and 1909 to 1913. From 1895 to 1899 he worked as publican of the Exchange Hotel in West Wyalong.

Parliamentary career

Andrew Kelly was a foundation member of the Labor Party and served as Member for West Sydney from 1891 to 1894, Member for Sydney-Denison from 1901 to 1904 and Member for Lachlan from 1904 until his death in 1913.

References 

 

1854 births
1913 deaths
Members of the New South Wales Legislative Assembly
Australian waterside workers
Australian people of Irish descent
Australian Labor Party members of the Parliament of New South Wales